The Ötscher, at , is a prominent peak in south-western Lower Austria. Its name has Slavic roots and translates approximately as a diminutive of "father". The Ötscher area belongs to the Ybbstal Alps, which are part of the Northern Limestone Alps. The boundary between the districts of Lilienfeld and Scheibbs lies directly on its peak.

Mountains of Lower Austria
Mountains of the Alps